Beyrut (also Romanized as Beyrūt) is a village in Rob-e Shamat Rural District, Sheshtomad District, Sabzevar County, Razavi Khorasan Province, Iran. At the 2006 census, its population was 592, in 150 families.

See also 

 List of cities, towns and villages in Razavi Khorasan Province

References 

Populated places in Sabzevar County